The Milwaukee Road classes F6 and F6-a comprised twenty-two steam locomotives of the 4-6-4 configuration, commonly nicknamed “Hudson” but known as “Baltic” on the Milwaukee Road.

The fourteen class F6 locomotives were not delivered from their builder, the Baldwin Locomotive Works of Philadelphia, Pennsylvania, until 1929–1930. In 1931, eight sister locomotives of class F6-a were delivered; these differed in few aspects but can be distinguished by the straight running boards of the F6-a, in contrast to the stepped running boards of the F6.

Technical details 
The 1925 design was by Milwaukee Road Chief Mechanical Engineer C. H. Bilty, with detail design by the Baldwin Locomotive Works, who actually built them. They represented the best of American locomotive practice at the time, and were given all the latest devices and fittings. A Coffin feedwater heater was fitted, which was the Milwaukee's favorite type; this was installed flush in the extended smokebox, and thus was not at all obvious. Possibly because of this, the boiler lagging was continued over the smokebox, which was not common; most North American locomotives had bare smokeboxes which were graphited, rather than painted. The associated steam-driven centrifugal water pump was located under the cab at the left rear. The class F6-a was fitted with the tender-mounted Wilson Water Conditioner instead of the Coffin feedwater heater.

Valve gear was of the low-maintenance Baker type, with (of course) power reverse. A front-end throttle was installed, with the distinctive linkage running along the boiler on the engineer's side.   A mechanical lubricator, driven from the crosshead on the engineer's side, fed oil to the cylinders, valves, guides and other parts of the running gear. Many of the locomotives were fitted with a speedometer, which was attached to the engineer’s side frontmost leading axle.

A single air pump for the locomotive and train air brakes was fitted to the fireman's (left) side, with air tanks under the running boards on both sides. Like all larger North American coal-burning locomotives of the time, an automatic stoker was fitted; the two-cylinder engine to drive this was under the cab floor on the fireman's side.

Modifications 
Locomotive #6401 received large, "Elephant ear" smoke deflectors in 1936 as an experiment; these were kept for several years, but were not fitted to other locomotives. Later that year a sheet-steel pilot was fitted to it and several other locomotives to replace the boiler-tube pilot installed from new. This featured a swing-up coupler. As well as giving a more attractive, streamlined look, this had a serious safety aspect; a sheet-steel pilot without a protruding coupler was more likely to deflect an obstacle without catching on it in e.g. a grade crossing accident.

Service 
At first the locomotives were used mostly between Chicago and Minneapolis, but later on when the F6-a locomotives arrived they served as far west as the beginning of the electrified zone.

When delivered the class F6 were numbered 6400–6413, with the class F6-a numbered 6414–6421. At the 1938 renumbering, they were numbered 125–138 and 139–146

Speed record 
On July 20, 1934, Milwaukee Road class F6 Baltic #6402 participated in a test run to prove the feasibility of a high-speed service, which was launched as the Hiawatha service in 1935. The test used a regular service train from Chicago, Illinois to Milwaukee, Wisconsin, train 29. This was redesignated as Second 27 just for that day and given a special, high-speed timing. The eventual Hiawatha timing was 75 minutes for this journey, and the Hiawatha timing was possibly the fastest scheduled train in the world in the 1930s.

He stated that:

This must be taken as the first time a U.S. steam loco topped “the hundred”.

More recently, British train timer Bryan Benn has taken the gradient profile given in Brian Reed's book and shown that it supports a maximum speed in excess of 101 mph during that portion of the run.

References 

 Benn, Bryan, Which was the world's first genuine 100 mph steam locomotive?. Retrieved February 5, 2010.

F6
Baldwin locomotives
4-6-4 locomotives
Railway locomotives introduced in 1930
Steam locomotives of the United States
Scrapped locomotives
Passenger locomotives
Standard gauge locomotives of the United States